Robert Wood Johnson I (February 20, 1845 – February 7, 1910) was an American industrialist. He was also one of the three brothers who founded Johnson & Johnson.

Early life
Johnson was born in Carbondale, Pennsylvania. His father was Sylvester Johnson III, and his mother was Frances Louisa Wood. Johnson grew up with two siblings: James Wood Johnson and Edward Mead Johnson. Johnson was educated in the public schools of Carbondale and at Wyoming Seminary in Kingston, Pennsylvania. The family belonged to an Episcopal church.

Career
In 1861, Johnson accepted an apprenticeship in Poughkeepsie, New York from his uncle James Wood to work for the apothecary of Wood & Tittmer. This was to become his training for a lifelong career. He later left Wood & Tittmer in 1864, to work in New York City for Roushton & Aspinwall.

Lister
While working for Rouston & Aspinwall, Johnson met George J. Seabury and they decided to leave the firm and go into business together under the name of Seabury & Johnson. Both men were interested in Joseph Lister's discovery of the implications of sterile surgery and tried to make products that would assist in the operating room. Johnson worked 12-hour days to try to invent aseptic surgical equipment. By 1878, the firm was making $10,000 a month

Seabury and Johnson disagreed on the distribution of the firm's profits. Seabury disapproved of having Johnson's brother, James Wood Johnson, in the firm. In 1880, Johnson sold his shares to Seabury, and agreed to abstain from the medical business for ten years.

Johnson & Johnson
Meanwhile, James Wood Johnson and Edward Mead Johnson started a family business called Johnson & Johnson. The firm struggled to remain profitable, as it had insufficient capital for a startup company. While the two brothers were proceeding alone, Seabury was unable to pay RWJ the monthly payments that had been agreed upon when Johnson departed the partnership. Seabury agreed to let Johnson re-enter the medical industry if Seabury could cease making the monthly payments. Johnson agreed, and joined his brothers' firm, providing the capital for a fresh start.

The new partnership gave Johnson half of the company's shares in return for management of the company. His brothers received 30% of the company. Johnson commuted between the factory in New Brunswick, New Jersey, and the office in New York. By early 1888, Johnson & Johnson was making $25,000 a month.

Kilmer
Dr. Frederick Barnett Kilmer owned a pharmacy in New Brunswick, New Jersey. Johnson met Kilmer in early 1887, and developed a lifelong friendship. After meeting Johnson, Kilmer became more involved in Johnson & Johnson. He eventually became an employee and introduced one of the first medical research laboratories.

Kilmer was responsible for making many of the innovations in sterilized dressings. The first marketing items Kilmer introduced were medical manuals; guides for how to react when injured aboard trains, such as when feet are crushed or when legs are broken.

Later, Kilmer influenced most of America with his new products. By the late 19th century, railroads had covered most of the nation. Americans were traveling more and farther than ever before. To address the medical needs of travelers, Kilmer introduced first-aid kits. The Red Cross symbol became as well known. Soon, people believed that the first-aid kits were as important to them as railroads and light bulbs. It became an American way of life to grab a first-aid kit when in need of help.

In 1890, Kilmer received a letter from a colleague seeking advice on treating skin irritation on one of his patients. The patient had used medicated plasters and it was assumed that the plaster caused the irritation. Kilmer sent him a small tin of Italian talc. With the success of this treatment, Johnson & Johnson started including containers of talc with its plasters.

Personal life

In 1880, Johnson married Ellen Cutler. They had one child: Roberta Johnson.

Johnson later married Evangeline Brewster Armstrong. They had three children: John Seward Johnson I, Robert Wood Johnson II, and Evangeline Johnson. His daughter Evangeline married composer Leopold Stokowski by whom she had two children.

In 1910, Johnson died of chronic kidney disease (Bright's disease) at the age of 64.

See also
 Robert Wood Johnson Foundation

References

External links
Johnson & Johnson corporate history

1845 births
1910 deaths
People from Carbondale, Pennsylvania
19th-century American businesspeople
Businesspeople in the pharmaceutical industry
People from New Brunswick, New Jersey
Robert Wood I
20th-century American businesspeople
Businesspeople from New Jersey
American company founders
Wyoming Seminary alumni